Events from the year 1861 in China.

Incumbents 
 Xianfeng Emperor (12th year)
 Tongzhi Emperor
 Regent: Empress Dowager Cixi
 Regent: Prince Gong

Events 
 Nian Rebellion
 Taiping Rebellion
 Battle of Guanzhong (1861)
 Battle of Shanghai (1861)
 Battle of Wuhan (1861)
 Ningbo surrenders to Taiping forces
 Eulenburg expedition
 Miao Rebellion (1854–73)
 Panthay Rebellion
 Xinyou Coup, Cixi seizes power
 Prince Gong made regent 
 establishes the Zongli Yamen after the Convention of Peking
 Tongzhi Restoration
 Self-Strengthening Movement begins

Births 

 Cheng Biguang
 Duanfang
 Liu Guanxiong
 Jiang Chaozong, (江朝宗) Kō Kōketsu; 1861–1943) was a general in the late Empire of China and an acting Premier of the Republic of China in 1917.

 Wang Zhanyuan
 Zhan Tianyou (Jeme Tien-yow), the father of China’s railroads

Deaths 

 Zaiyuan
 Xianfeng Emperor
 Sushun
 Duanhua
 Hu Linyi